Abaucourt is a commune in the Meurthe-et-Moselle department in northeastern France.

As of 2019, Abaucourt has a population of 296. Inhabitants are called Abaucourtois.

Geography
One arrives in Abaucourt by the D45 by way of Nomeny (by the west) or by Létricourt (by the southwest).  2.6 km separates it from Nomeny and region 15 of Pont-à-Mousson.

History
Etymology of the name:
Names ending in "court" come from the Latin "cortis", which indicated a farmyard.  The name is applied to the farm itself, around which the village formed.  Consequently, the etymology of the word Abaucourt could be considered as such :
 Ab (preposition) = "of a different place"
 Ad (preposition) = "at, towards, around"
 ''Cortem, Cortis' = "of the court, farm, property"
 Various titles from the 12th century (originated in the archives of the college of Fénétrange) mention Abaucourt and the court and estate of Vitrimont that depended on this village : one or the other belonged to Abbey Saint-Pierre-et-Saint-Paul de Neuwiller-lès-Saverne in Alsace.  This it is attested by a papal bull issued by Pope Alexander III in 1178 where the church of Abaucourt was listed as property belonging to the abbey.
 Razing as a result of World War I

Administration

Population

Sights
 Estate purchased for the Duke de Lorraine in 1562. Destroyed during the Thirty Years War.
 Château de Vintremont destroyed after 1842.

Religious buildings
 Church rebuilt in 1918

Civil buildings
 Town hall
 School

See also
 Communes of the Meurthe-et-Moselle department

References

External links 

 Photography of Abaucourt
 Abaucourt 

Communes of Meurthe-et-Moselle